The Treasure of Lost Canyon is a 1952 American Technicolor adventure Western film directed by Ted Tetzlaff and starring William Powell, Julie Adams, Charles Drake, Tommy Ivo and Rosemary DeCamp. It was based on Robert Louis Stevenson's short story The Treasure of Franchard.

Plot

Cast
 William Powell as Homer 'Doc' Brown  
 Julie Adams as Myra Wade 
 Charles Drake as Jim Anderson  
 Rosemary DeCamp as Samuella  
 Tommy Ivo as David  
 Henry Hull as Cousin Lucius Cooke  
 Chubby Johnson as Baltimore Dan  
 John Doucette as Gyppo  
 Marvin Press as Paddy  
 Griff Barnett Judge Wade

References

Bibliography
 Bryant, Roger. William Powell: The Life and Films. McFarland, 2006.

External links
 

1952 films
1952 Western (genre) films
American Western (genre) films
Universal Pictures films
Films based on works by Robert Louis Stevenson
Treasure hunt films
Films based on short fiction
1950s English-language films
1950s American films